Roiu is a small borough in Kastre Parish, Tartu County, in eastern Estonia.

References 

Boroughs and small boroughs in Estonia